Lalehzar Rural District (also Romanized as Lāleh Zār; also known as Ghārat Mālgeh) is a rural district (Dehestan) in Lalehzar District, Bardsir County, Kerman Province, Iran. At the 2006 census, its population was 5,543 across ten villages, with 1,289 families.

References 

Rural Districts of Kerman Province
Bardsir County